People on Sunday is a 1930 German silent drama film directed by Robert Siodmak and Edgar G. Ulmer from a screenplay by Robert and Curt Siodmak. The film follows a group of residents of Berlin on a summer's day during the interwar period. Hailed as a work of genius, it is a pivotal film in the development of German cinema and Hollywood. The film features the talents of Eugen Schüfftan (cinematography), Billy Wilder (story) and Fred Zinnemann (cinematography assistant).

Production
The film is subtitled "a film without actors" and was filmed on Sundays in the summer of 1929. The actors were amateurs whose day jobs were those that they portrayed in the film—the opening titles inform the audience that these actors have all returned to their normal jobs by the time of the film's release in February 1930. They were part of a collective of young Berliners who wrote and produced the film on a shoestring.  This lightly scripted, loosely observational work of New Objectivity became a surprise hit.

People on Sunday is notable for its portrayal of daily life in Berlin before Adolf Hitler became Chancellor and as an early work by writer/director Billy Wilder before he moved to the United States to escape from Hitler's Germany.

The film is the directorial debut of the Siodmak Brothers. The film was co-produced by Moriz Seeler, founder of the Filmstudio 1929 production company and Seymour Nebenzal, cousin to the Siodmaks, whose father Heinrich put up the money. The film began a 30-year collaborative friendship between Nebenzal and Wilder.

Siodmak called it "a nice little film" and said Wilder only worked on the movie "a couple of minutes" contributing some ideas.

Plot
The film opens at Bahnhof Zoo train station one Saturday morning. Its opening scenes show the bustling traffic of central Berlin. The movie follows five central characters over a weekend. Wolfgang (Wolfgang von Waltershausen), a handsome young man, sees a pretty woman (Christl Ehlers) who seems to be waiting in the street for someone who has not arrived. He takes her for an ice cream, teases her about having been stood up and invites her to a picnic the following day.

Erwin (Erwin Splettstößer) is doing his day job as a taxi driver. While he is fixing the car, his depot receives a phone call from his girlfriend, Annie (Annie Schreyer), who wants to know if they are going to the cinema that evening. Erwin clearly is not keen to go. (One of the motifs of the movie is to play down the importance of the cinema in the lives of these young Berliners.) At the end of the day, Erwin returns home to find Annie moping about in their threadbare apartment. The couple bicker continually as they prepare to go to the cinema. The first fight is regarding the pictures of movie stars in their bathroom.  Annie cherishes the pictures of various actors while Erwin enjoys the photos of actresses, and the couple tear up each other's pictures during the squabble. Another argument arises over whether Annie should wear the brim of her hat up or down. (Another theme of the movie is the self-centred machismo represented by Erwin and Wolfgang.) Wolfgang arrives in the middle of this argument and Annie never gets to the cinema; Erwin and Wolfgang drink beer instead and plan to go to the countryside the following day.

The next morning, the two men take a train to Nikolassee, accompanied by Christl and her friend Brigitte (Brigitte Borchert). Annie stays home, sleeping away the day. The four daytrippers walk to Wannsee, along with many other Berliners, to enjoy the beaches and parks. As the four friends have a picnic, swim in the lake and play records on a portable gramophone, Wolfgang flirts with Brigitte, to the annoyance of Christl. He later play-chases Brigitte into the forest, where they find a secluded spot and make love. Afterwards, the four friends take a boat-ride, during which Erwin and Wolfgang flirt with two girls who are in a rowing boat.

As they head back into Berlin, Brigitte suggests to Wolfgang that they meet again the following Sunday. He agrees, but Erwin reminds him afterwards that they had planned instead to attend a football match. Wolfgang's decision remains unresolved. Erwin returns to find Annie still lying in bed, slowly waking up to realize this was the day for their excursion. Erwin angrily shows her what time it is. The final scene returns to shots of the streets of Berlin. The closing series of intertitles announces: "And then on Monday... it is back to work... back to the everyday... back to the daily grind... Four...  million... wait for... the next Sunday. The end.".

Cast
The five leading parts were all played by amateur actors.
 , the taxi driver. He liked acting and appeared later in small roles in two other films also directed by Robert Siodmak, Abschied (1930) and Voruntersuchung (1931). In 1931 he was killed when his own taxi accidentally ran over him.
 , the record shop sales assistant. She was selling records when she was discovered for this film. It was her only role. She married the illustrator Wilhelm M. Busch in 1936, appeared in Weekend am Wannsee, a documentary about People on Sunday, in 2000, and died in Hamburg-Blankenese in August 2011, aged 100.
 , the wine shop sales assistant. He was born into a wealthy family in Bavaria in 1900 and was a descendant of Georg Friedrich Sartorius. He later had small roles in two other films. Under the Third Reich he worked in mining and in post-war West Germany he sold books and audiocassettes. He was married twice and died in  1973.
 , the film extra. She was born in 1910, the daughter of a harpsichordist and an artist. She left Germany in 1933 and lived with her mother in the United States. She had a bit part in the Hollywood film Escape (1940). She later married and had four more children, in addition to one child from a previous marriage. She worked with her husband in a family-owned aircraft company and also had her own vitamin business. Christina and her husband died together when their private plane crashed in New Mexico in 1960. 
 Annie Schreyer, the model. There appears to be no information available about her.

Four well-known actors of the Weimar Republic appear in small roles:
 Kurt Gerron as himself
 Valeska Gert as herself
 Heinrich Gretler as himself
 Ernö Verebes as himself

Reception
Contemporary critics regarded the movie as an accurate and laconic portrayal of the Berlin they knew and saw the closing intertitles as an accurate claim that these characters represent ordinary real-life Berliners. In retrospect, these closing words have gained an ironic poignancy in light of the later horrors of Nazi Germany.

Revivals
In the autumn of 2002, Menschen am Sonntag was presented at one of Berlin's popular Jewish Culture Days. The Berlin-based Eastern European group Trio Bravo+ was commissioned to produce a new silent movie score for the film, which proved highly successful and was subsequently released as a standalone soundtrack CD.

In 2005, the Netherlands Film Institute released an updated DVD of the film, restoring some missing scenes and commissioning a new score from Elena Kats-Chernin. This is the version used by the British Film Institute as the basis for its own DVD entitled People on Sunday, released 25 April 2005.

The Criterion Collection released their edition of Menschen am Sonntag on Blu-ray and DVD in the United States on 28 June 2011, with a score by The Mont Alto Motion Picture Orchestra, and the Elena Kats-Chernin soundtrack as an alternate.

Prior to the production of the German television series Babylon Berlin, producer Stephan Arndt and director Achim von Borries screened "Menschen am Sontag" for the entire cast and crew to help them better understand life in Berlin under the Weimar Republic, before the Nazi era.

References

External links
 Watch entire movie online
 People on Sunday at German Films
 
 
People on Sunday: Young People Like Us an essay by Noah Isenberg at the Criterion Collection

1930 films
German black-and-white films
Films set in Berlin
German silent feature films
Films of the Weimar Republic
Films directed by Robert Siodmak
Films directed by Curt Siodmak
Films with screenplays by Billy Wilder
Films directed by Edgar G. Ulmer
Films produced by Seymour Nebenzal
1930 directorial debut films
1930s German-language films